Skye Alexandra Sweetnam (born May 5, 1988) is a Canadian singer, actress, and music video director. She first entered the music industry in 2003 with the release of her debut single "Billy S." More than a year later, her debut studio album, Noise from the Basement, was released along with the singles "Tangled Up in Me" and "Number One". Sweetnam is also known for her voice work in The Barbie Diaries. In 2006, she was nominated for a Juno Award for New Artist of the Year. Her second studio album, Sound Soldier, was released in 2007. She is currently the lead singer of the band Sumo Cyco; upon joining the band, she took the stage name Sever.

Early life
Skye was born on May 5, 1988, to Deirdre and Greg Sweetnam. She was named after the Isle of Skye in Scotland. Along with her sister, Aurora, and her brother, Cam, she was born and raised in Bolton, a community in Caledon, Ontario, where she studied dancing and singing from a young age. She began singing at the age of five, performing for family members and friends.

Music career

2003–2006: Noise from the Basement
In 2003, Sweetnam worked with Canadian producer and instrumentalist James Robertson on what would later become Noise from the Basement, her Capitol Records/EMI debut. The single "Billy S." appeared in July 2003 on the soundtrack to the movie How to Deal and quickly took off in Canada. Two more singles were released from the debut album; they fared moderately on the charts. In 2004, Sweetnam went on tour over Europe and North America as the opening act for Britney Spears on her Onyx Hotel Tour.

Sweetnam also provided the theme songs for various television shows including The Buzz on Maggie for Disney Channel, Wayside for Teletoon and Radio Free Roscoe. She also covered "Part of Your World" from the 1989 Disney film The Little Mermaid for the compilation albums Disneymania 3 and DisneyRemixMania. In 2006, Sweetnam provided the singing voice for Barbie in The Barbie Diaries. Her songs "Girl Most Likely To", "Note to Self", "Real Life", and "This Is Me", were also included in the soundtrack to The Barbie Diaries.

2007–2008: Sound Soldier
In March 2007, Sweetnam and Rancid frontman Tim Armstrong released the single Into Action, a song written by Armstrong for Sweetnam's upcoming 
Sound Soldier album.  The song also featured The Aggrolites.  Sweetnam was the opening act for Canadian Idol winner Kalan Porter on tour.

Her album Sound Soldier was released October 30, 2007; its lead single, "Human", was nominated for a 2008 MuchMusic Video Award for Best Cinematography, but lost to Hedley's "She's So Sorry". For the second single EMI picked "(Let's Get Movin') Into Action", a rework of her previous single with Armstrong. Sweetnam directed two music videos herself for "Music Is My Boyfriend" and "Babydoll Gone Wrong". Throughout 2009 and 2010, she released a number of songs from Sound Soldier. Meanwhile, in her YouTube make-up tutorials, Sweetnam has used the songs "Rock n' Roll Baby", "Love Sugar Sweet", "Heartbreak", "Boomerang", "MuSick", and "Wolves and Witches". Sweetnam also released a song entitled "Stay", along with "Boomerang", "MuSick" and "Wolves and Witches", on her MySpace page.

Sweetnam also recorded "Where I want to be" for Jun Senoue's album, The Works, and directed a music video for Leah Daniels' song "Northern Señorita" as well as for Ashes' song "Explode (Makes My Head)". Sweetnam also co-wrote two songs for Ashes.

2009–present: Sumo Cyco

Sweetnam began working on new music in 2009 and formed a new band, Sumo Cyco, a four-piece heavy metal and punk rock band that opened for Hollywood Undead in Toronto in April 2011. Sweetnam now went by the name Sever, which was her current alter-ego.

, Sumo Cyco has released six singles: "Mercy", "Limp", "Interceptor", "Danger", "Loose Cannon", and a cover of Oingo Boingo's "Who Do You Want To Be?". With each new song, Sumo Cyco would direct and put together their own music videos for their YouTube channel which, has received over seven million views.

Sweetnam's song "(Let's Get Movin') Into Action" was also used in an episode of the Canadian teen drama Degrassi: The Next Generation, in one deleted scene from Bandslam, and in the films Balls Out: Gary the Tennis Coach, Hotel for Dogs, and the 2010 popular film Ramona and Beezus (starring Joey King and Selena Gomez). It was also included in the soundtrack for Music from Degrassi: The Next Generation.

On June 9, 2012, Sweetnam posted a video on her YouTube channel that promised that a new material will eventually be released.

In April and May 2014, Sumo Cyco toured Ireland and the UK after their performances at Indie Week Ireland. Then, on June 10, 2014, they released their debut album, Lost in Cyco City, in Canada.

On March 10, 2015, Sumo Cyco announced that they had signed with TKO (The Kirby Organization) Booking Agency, known for its representation of hard rock and metal acts, for worldwide representation.

Sumo Cyco released their second album Opus Mar in 2017.

In January 2020, the band announced that they had signed a deal with Napalm Records. They released their third album Initiation through Napalm Records in 2021.

Filmography

Discography

Skye Sweetnam
 Noise from the Basement (2004)
 Sound Soldier (2007)
Sumo Cyco
 Lost in Cyco City (2014)
 Opus Mar (2017)
 Initiation (2021)

See also
List of Skye Sweetnam songs

Awards and nominations

References

External links

  
 Skye Sweetnam's YouTube Channel
 

 
1988 births
Living people
Capitol Records artists
Canadian child singers
Canadian songwriters
Canadian singer-songwriters
Canadian voice actresses
Sweetnam, Skye
Canadian women singer-songwriters
Musicians from Ontario
People from Caledon, Ontario
Pop punk singers
Women punk rock singers
21st-century Canadian women singers